Ternstroemia wallichiana is a species of plant in the Pentaphylacaceae family. It is found in Malaysia and Singapore. It is threatened by habitat loss.

References

wallichiana
Vulnerable plants
Flora of Malaya
Taxonomy articles created by Polbot